The Marine Reserves Act is an Act of Parliament in New Zealand.

In 2000 the Department of Conservation started a review of the Act resulting in a draft Marine Reserves Bill that was introduced into Parliament in June 2002.

See also
List of marine reserves in New Zealand

References

External links
Text of the Act

Statutes of New Zealand
Nature conservation in New Zealand
1971 in New Zealand law
1971 in the environment
Environmental law in New Zealand